The Bisnovat (later Molniya then Vympel) R-40 (NATO reporting name AA-6 'Acrid') is a long-range air-to-air missile developed in the 1960s by the Soviet Union specifically for the MiG-25P interceptor, but can also be carried by the later MiG-31. It is the largest air-to-air missile in the world ever to go into production.

Development
The development of the Mach 3+ North American XB-70 Valkyrie threatened to make the entire interceptor and missile force of the Voyska PVO obsolete at one stroke, thanks to its incredible speed and altitude performance. In order to counter this new threat, the MiG-25 was designed, but new air-to-air missiles were also required to enable the MiG-25 to engage its intended targets at the high speeds and altitudes dictated by the requirements. The Bisnovat design bureau began development of the long-range air-to-air missile in 1962. The resulting R-40 was initially matched with the Smerch-A ("Tornado-A") radar of the MiG-25. It has built in semi-active radar homing (R-40R), with an inverse monopulse seeker which give the missile ability to engage targets in all-aspects and infrared homing (R-40T) versions.

To guarantee a kill at such high speeds in thin air, a large warhead was needed to have a sufficient blast effect. Large control fins were required to give the missile enough maneuverability at high altitude. All this necessitated a very large missile; as a result, the R-40 is the largest air-to-air missile ever to enter production. It is slightly larger than the MIM-23 Hawk surface-to-air missile.

Following the defection of Soviet Air Defense Forces pilot Viktor Belenko in 1976 and the compromising of the MiG-25P's systems and the associated R-40s, Vympel developed an improved version of the missile with a better infrared countermeasures (IRCM) resistance and more sensitive seekers. The upgraded missiles were designated with the suffix -D (for 'dorabotannye', "finalized"). Later -D1 versions were also developed.

Production of the R-40 ended in 1991, but it remains in limited service arming surviving MiG-25 and some MiG-31 interceptors.

Combat history
In Soviet service, the R-40 was never fired in anger. Standard PVO procedure was to fire a two-missile salvo at a target: one heat-seeking R-40T missile followed by a SARH R-40R, to avoid the possibility of the heat-seeking missile locking-on to the radar-guided missile.

As the MiG-25 has been exported to various states in the Middle East, the R-40 has been used in combat by Iraq and probably by Syria and Libya. 

During the Persian gulf war of 1991 on the first night, a McDonnell Douglas F/A-18 Hornet of US Navy piloted by Scott Speicher of VFA-81 was shot down by an R-40 missile fired by an IQAF MiG-25 piloted by Zuhair Dawood. 

On 30 January 1991, an IRAF MiG-25 used an R-40 missile to damage a USAF F-15C during the Sammura air battle.

Operators

Current operators

Former operators
  Retired. 660 missiles originally delivered.
  Captured examples used as makeshift surface-to-air missiles.
 
 
  Passed on to successor states.

Notes

References

External links
 Federation of American Scientists page 
 GlobalSecurity.org page

Air-to-air missiles of Russia
Air-to-air missiles of the Soviet Union
Cold War air-to-air missiles of the Soviet Union
Vympel NPO products
Military equipment introduced in the 1970s